The desert tree frog (Litoria rubella), or little red tree frog, is a species of tree frog native to Australia, southern New Guinea, and Timor. It is one of Australia's most widely distributed frogs, inhabiting northern Australia, including desert regions and much of temperate eastern Australia. It is one of the few Australian tree frogs to inhabit arid, tropical, and temperate climates.

Description

It is rotund, with a small, flat head. It has short arms and strong, short legs. Its ventral surface is white, and the dorsal surface ranges from light grey to dark red and has small black flecks. Adult specimens from Cooktown, Queensland, often show a pronounced metallic sheen on the dorsal surface, ranging in colour from bronze to gold. A dark band runs from the snout, across the eye, and along the flanks of the frog. The throats of males in breeding season are a dark grey colour. The groin is lemon-yellow, and the tympanum is visible. Baby frogs have an almost transparent abdomen, allowing a clear view of their abdominal organs.

Ecology and behaviour
The wide distribution and the large range of habitats it inhabits create a large variation in breeding habits. Populations that live in temperate or tropical zones breed annually during the wet season or summer. However, the populations in desert regions will breed whenever rain occurs. Tadpole development is dependent on the temperature of the water. Small amounts of water heat to higher temperatures, which triggers the tadpoles to develop faster; some develop in just 14 days.

Unlike most desert frogs, it does not burrow to avoid heat and desiccation. It will seek out shelter under rocks, trees, or leaf litter. They are commonly found around human dwellings where water is available and can be found in sinks, toilets or drain pipes.

References
Sources
 
 
Notes

Litoria
Fauna of Timor
Amphibians of Queensland
Amphibians of New South Wales
Amphibians of South Australia
Amphibians of Western Australia
Amphibians of the Northern Territory
Amphibians of Indonesia
Amphibians of Papua New Guinea
Amphibians described in 1842
Taxa named by John Edward Gray
Frogs of Australia